Maplewood is a township in Essex County in the U.S. state of New Jersey. The township is an inner-ring suburban bedroom community of New York City in the New York metropolitan area. As of the 2020 United States census, the township's population was 25,684, an increase of 1,817 (+7.6%) from the 2010 census count of 23,867, which in turn reflected a decline of one person from the 23,868 counted in the 2000 census.

History
When surveying the area now known as Maplewood, Robert Treat found several trails used by Lenape tribes of Algonquian Native Americans, though there was only sparse pre-European settlement. These paths form the basis for what are the township's main thoroughfares today.

The first European settlers arrived around 1675, primarily English, Dutch and French Puritans who had earlier settled Hempstead, Long Island, and Stamford, Connecticut, via Newark and Elizabeth. They had acquired most of today's Essex County from the Native Americans and followed three trails that roughly correspond to South Orange Avenue, Springfield Avenue and Ridgewood Road. These three routes resulted in the development of three separate communities that coalesced to become Maplewood and South Orange. Those who came from Newark on the trail that now corresponds to South Orange Avenue settled the area that became South Orange village.

Six families (with last names of Smith, Brown, Pierson, Freeman, Ball and Gildersleeve) came up today's Ridgewood Road and established scattered farms around a center that became Jefferson Village, named after Thomas Jefferson. This settlement, which roughly corresponds to downtown Maplewood today, developed several mills and orchards. John Durand, the son of Hudson River School painter Asher Brown Durand (who was born in Maplewood in 1796), describes the place as a picturesque but slightly backward community with close ties to Springfield. The apple harvest was apparently quite impressive and included the "Harrison" and "Canfield" varieties. By 1815, there were approximately 30 families in the community. Although the residents of the area were predominantly Presbyterian, the first house of worship was a Baptist chapel in 1812. This was in use until 1846 and fell into disrepair until 1858, when it was taken into use as a Methodist Episcopal church.

Those who came up today's Springfield Avenue settled on a hill crest near today's intersection between Tuscan and Springfield Avenue and established a hamlet known as North Farms. Over time, this community became known as the Hilton section. It became a stagecoach stop between Newark, Jersey City (then Paulus Hook), and Morristown and thereby a center for trade and light manufacturing. The village changed its name from North Farms to Middleville in 1830, and then to Hilton in 1880 when it was granted a post office. In 1855, Seth Boyden settled in what was then Middleville to retire but innovated a number of agricultural products, especially berries. Boyden also built and put into operation the first steam engines to service the railroad through Maplewood. The area became known for its orchards and related industries, including cider mills and rum distilleries, as well as honey and livestock.

In 1802, Jefferson Village and North Farms were named as districts within the Township of Newark.

The three communities developed and functioned independently, each establishing their own school associations: South Orange established the Columbian School in 1814, which would form the basis of Columbia High School; North Farms established the North Farms Association in 1817; and Jefferson Village the Jefferson Association in 1818. In 1867, when the State of New Jersey established public education through the School Law, the newly appointed County Superintendent merged the three associations into one school district, which was formalized in 1894 as the South Orange-Maplewood School District. James Ricalton, a teacher born in New York of Scottish parents who became the school district's first permanent teacher, helped set the high standard of education that persists in the school district to this day.

Maplewood was originally formed as South Orange Township, which was created on April 1, 1861, from portions of Clinton Township and what was then the Town of Orange. Portions of the township were taken to form South Orange village (established May 4, 1869, within the township and became fully independent on March 4, 1904) and Vailsburg borough (formed March 28, 1894, and annexed by Newark on January 1, 1905) The name of the township was changed to Maplewood on November 7, 1922.

When the Morris and Essex Railroad from Newark was extended to the area in 1838, a land speculator by the name of John Shedden built a railroad station in Jefferson Village and named it Maplewood. This name came to comprise areas known as Hilton, Jefferson Village, and areas previously part of Springfield. In 1868, farms were subdivided into parcels for residential housing and the area became a commuter suburb. 

Edward Balch (1858–1934) was a homebuilder who envisioned Maplewood as a suburban community and starting around 1900 developed a total of 176 homes in the township, earning him recognition by The New York Times as the "Father of Maplewood."

The 1920s saw significant growth in new residents and structures.

Geography

According to the United States Census Bureau, the township had a total area of 3.88 square miles (10.04 km2), including 3.87 square miles (10.03 km2) of land and <0.01 square miles (0.01 km2) of water (0.08%). A pond is in Memorial Park, the Rahway River runs through the township and there is a municipal pool club with four man-made pools of water; the remainder of the area is land.

The township shares a border with West Orange and South Orange to the north, Newark and Irvington to the east, Union (in Union County) to the south, and Millburn to the west.

Unincorporated communities, localities and place names located partially or completely within the township include Hilton and Valley View.

Climate
Maplewood has a hot-summer humid continental climate (Köppen climate classification Dfa).

Demographics

2010 census

The Census Bureau's 2006–2010 American Community Survey showed that (in 2010 inflation-adjusted dollars) median household income was $101,463 (with a margin of error of +/− $6,610) and the median family income was $122,102 (+/− $9,324). Males had a median income of $83,656 (+/− $10,885) versus $57,422 (+/− $5,551) for females. The per capita income for the borough was $47,404 (+/− $2,404). About 1.5% of families and 2.8% of the population were below the poverty line, including 1.5% of those under age 18 and 3.1% of those age 65 or over.

2000 census
As of the 2000 United States census there were 23,868 people, 8,452 households, and 6,381 families residing in the township. The population density was 6,207.1 people per square mile (2,393.6/km2). There were 8,615 housing units at an average density of 2,240.4 per square mile (864.0/km2). The racial makeup of the township was 58.78% White, 32.63% Black, 0.13% Native American, 2.86% Asian, 0.03% Pacific Islander, 1.56% from other races, and 4.01% from two or more races. Hispanic or Latino of any race were 5.23% of the population.

There were 8,452 households, out of which 40.6% had children under the age of 18 living with them, 58.2% were married couples living together, 13.3% had a female householder with no husband present, and 24.5% were non-families. 20.4% of all households were made up of individuals, and 9.8% had someone living alone who was 65 years of age or older. The average household size was 2.81 and the average family size was 3.27.

In the township, the age distribution of the population shows 28.0% under the age of 18, 5.6% from 18 to 24, 30.2% from 25 to 44, 24.0% from 45 to 64, and 12.1% who were 65 years of age or older. The median age was 38 years. For every 100 females, there were 90.6 males. For every 100 females age 18 and over, there were 86.1 males.

The median income for a household in the township was $79,637, and the median income for a family was $92,724. Males had a median income of $57,572 versus $41,899 for females. The per capita income for the township was $36,794. 4.4% of the population and 3.4% of families were below the poverty line. 4.9% of those under the age of 18 and 6.0% of those 65 and older were living below the poverty line.

Arts and culture
In 2018 Brooke Lea Foster of The New York Times described Maplewood as one of several "least suburban of suburbs, each one celebrated by buyers there for its culture and hip factor, as much as the housing stock and sophisticated post-city life."

Performance venues
The township owns and operates the Burgdorff Center for the Performing Arts at 10 Durand Road.  The Center, a former Christian Science Church, was donated to the town by Jean Burgdorff, a local real estate entrepreneur. The building was transferred to the town on October 15, 1988. In 2008, the township committed to a $130,000 plan to improve the building.

Maplewoodstock
Every year, on the weekend following the weekend closest to July 4, there is a concert in town called Maplewoodstock. The free concert consists of local and national bands performing alongside various stalls showcasing local businesses.

Architecture and landscape
Many of the more recognizable buildings and spaces were the work of famous architects and landscape designers. Most of the schools and the Municipal Building were the work of Guilbert & Betelle. The center of town is dominated by Memorial Park, a design of the Olmsted Brothers. The Olmsted firm was also responsible for the landscaping at Ward Homestead, designed by John Russell Pope, and now known as Winchester Gardens, located on Elmwood Avenue. On the opposite side of town is another Olmsted work, South Mountain Reservation. The Maplewood Theater, designed by William E. Lehman, was where Cheryl Crawford first revived Porgy and Bess.

Popular culture

 Ultimate Frisbee (now called simply "Ultimate") was invented in Maplewood in 1968 by students at Columbia High School.  A plaque commemorating the birthplace of Ultimate Frisbee is located in the student parking lot.
 Maplewood is the birthplace of the wooden golf tee, invented by William Lowell at the Maplewood Golf Club in 1921.
 Maplewood has been the site for several films, including I Wanna Hold Your Hand, Garden State, Gracie, One True Thing, and Stepmom.
 Zach Braff, a Columbia High School alumnus, filmed a scene in his 2004 film, Garden State, where he and Natalie Portman drive by the front of Columbia High School.
 In the 2007 film Gracie, the plot is set in and partially filmed in Maplewood and Columbia High School.  Producer Andrew Shue and actress Elisabeth Shue both attended Columbia, and the plot is loosely based on their lives during high school.
 Bullet For My Valentine filmed their music video for "Waking the Demon" in Maplewood.
 The main character of the Robert Sheckley novel Dimension of Miracles, Thomas Carmody, is from Maplewood. He revisits the town, albeit one belonging in an alternate universe, late in the book.
 Novelist Philip Roth, who grew up in neighboring Newark refers to Maplewood in several of his novels, including Goodbye, Columbus.
 StarFish, a rock band for children.

Parks and recreation
 Memorial Park is a  park adjacent to the railway station, designed in the 1920s by landscape architects Brinley and Holbrook and the Olmsted Brothers that has been listed on the National Register of Historic Places. Other town parks include Maplecrest Park, DeHart Park and Milo S. Borden Park. 
 The town is bordered to the northwest by South Mountain Reservation, a  nature reserve on the Rahway River that is part of the Essex County Park System.
 The East Branch of the Rahway River travels through the township.

Government

Local government

Maplewood is governed under the Township form of government, one of 141 municipalities (of the 564) statewide that use this form. The governing body is a Township Committee, which is comprised of five members who are elected directly by the voters at-large in partisan elections to serve three-year terms of office on a staggered basis, with either one or two seats coming up for election each year as part of the November general election in a three-year cycle. At an annual reorganization meeting, the Township Committee selects one of its members to serve as Mayor for a one-year term, and another to serve as Deputy Mayor. The Mayor has the responsibility of Chair for the Township Committee meetings with voice and vote. The Mayor is considered the head of the municipal government.

The Township Committee is the legislative body of the municipality and is responsible for enacting the township's laws. The Township Committee is also an executive body. Under this form of government, the elected Township Committee sets policy and overall direction for the Township. The Township staff, under the direction of the Township Administrator, carries out Committee policy and provides day to day services. The Township Administrator serves as the chief administrative officer and is accountable to the Township Committee.

, members of the Maplewood Township Committee are Mayor Dean Dafis (D, term on committee and as mayor ends December 31, 2023), Deputy Mayor Deborah Engel (D, term on committee ends 2025; term as deputy mayor ends 2023), Nancy J. Adams (D, 2024), Jamaine L. Cripe (D, 2024) and Victor De Luca (D, 2023).

Federal, state, and county representation

Maplewood is located in the 11th Congressional District and is part of New Jersey's 27th state legislative district.

Politics

As of March 2011, there were a total of 16,399 registered voters in Maplewood, of which 9,306 (56.7%) were registered as Democrats, 1,439 (8.8%) were registered as Republicans and 5,645 (34.4%) were registered as Unaffiliated. There were 9 voters registered as Libertarians or Greens.

In the 2012 presidential election, Democrat Barack Obama received 84.4% of the vote (10,007 cast), ahead of Republican Mitt Romney with 14.9% (1,764 votes), and other candidates with 0.8% (91 votes), among the 11,924 ballots cast by the township's 17,391 registered voters (62 ballots were spoiled), for a turnout of 68.6%. In the 2008 presidential election, Democrat Barack Obama received 81.9% of the vote (10,649 cast), ahead of Republican John McCain with 16.6% (2,156 votes) and other candidates with 0.7% (90 votes), among the 13,003 ballots cast by the township's 16,523 registered voters, for a turnout of 78.7%. In the 2004 presidential election, Democrat John Kerry received 76.3% of the vote (9,113 ballots cast), outpolling Republican George W. Bush with 22.7% (2,709 votes) and other candidates with 0.6% (90 votes), among the 11,943 ballots cast by the township's 15,289 registered voters, for a turnout percentage of 78.1.

In the 2013 gubernatorial election, Democrat Barbara Buono received 69.0% of the vote (4,833 cast), ahead of Republican Chris Christie with 29.6% (2,074 votes), and other candidates with 1.4% (97 votes), among the 7,116 ballots cast by the township's 17,502 registered voters (112 ballots were spoiled), for a turnout of 40.7%. In the 2009 gubernatorial election, Democrat Jon Corzine received 72.2% of the vote (5,871 ballots cast), ahead of Republican Chris Christie with 20.3% (1,650 votes), Independent Chris Daggett with 6.2% (507 votes) and other candidates with 0.8% (65 votes), among the 8,135 ballots cast by the township's 16,202 registered voters, yielding a 50.2% turnout.

Community

Maplewood is a diverse and family-friendly community. The township has a downtown area alternatively known as "the village" or "Maplewood Center". The structure of the downtown is largely unchanged since the 1950s.  Maplewood won New Jersey Monthly magazine's Downtown Showdown in 2015, with the editor's noting the community's "myriad boutiques, art galleries and notable restaurants".

Maplewood is home to a gay village or "gayborhood." In June 2018, Maplewood unveiled permanently rainbow-colored crosswalks to celebrate LGBTQ pride across the full year.

Maplewood counts among its residents a large number of theater professionals working in Broadway and off-Broadway productions, owing to the town's convenient rail access and relatively short commute via train into Manhattan. In 2010, a group of 32 of these actors and technicians formed their own repertory theater company and named it Midtown Direct Rep, after the NJ Transit line on which they all commuted.

Education

Maplewood is part of the unified South Orange-Maplewood School District, together with the neighboring community of South Orange. The district has a single high school (located in Maplewood), two middle schools, a central pre-school, and neighborhood elementary schools in each municipality. As of the 2019–20 school year, the district, comprised of 11 schools, had an enrollment of 7,353 students and 576.1 classroom teachers (on an FTE basis), for a student–teacher ratio of 12.8:1. Schools in the district (with 2019–20 school enrollment data from the National Center for Education Statistics) are 
Montrose Early Childhood Center (133 students, in Pre-K; located in Maplewood), 
Seth Boyden Elementary Demonstration School (493 students, in grades K–5 located in Maplewood), 
Clinton Elementary School (605, K–5; Maplewood), 
Jefferson Elementary School (544, 3–5; Maplewood), 
Marshall Elementary School (518, K–2; South Orange), 
South Mountain Elementary School (647, K–5; South Orange), 
South Mountain Elementary School Annex (NA, K–1; South Orange), 
Tuscan Elementary School (K–5, 637; Maplewood), 
Maplewood Middle School (827, 6–8; Maplewood), 
South Orange Middle School (786, 6–8; South Orange) and 
Columbia High School (1,967, 9–12; Maplewood).

Transportation

Roads and highways

Two nearby controlled-access highways serve Maplewood: the Garden State Parkway, which runs north–south, and Interstate 78, which runs east–west.

There are approximately 226 streets within Maplewood. Springfield Avenue is a state highway (Route 124), from Irvington to Morristown), and four thoroughfares are Essex County roads (Valley Street, Millburn Avenue, Irvington Avenue, Wyoming Avenue), including County Route 577.

Public transportation

NJ Transit provides passenger rail service to Maplewood station on the Morristown Line and Gladstone Branch to Newark Broad Street Station, Secaucus Junction and New York Penn Station, with connecting service to Hoboken Terminal.

NJ Transit bus service to Newark on the 25, 37 and 70, and to the Port Authority Bus Terminal in Midtown Manhattan on the 107 route. Independent Bus provides bus service on its 31 route.

The township operates the rush-hour Maplewood Jitney service to and from the train station.

Notable people

People who were born in, residents of, or otherwise closely associated with Maplewood include:

 Harriet Adams (1893–1982), author of some 200 books, including nearly 50 in the Nancy Drew series
 Mobolaji Akiode (born 1982), former Nigerian women's professional basketball player
 Jason Alexander (born 1959), actor, best known for his role as George Costanza in Seinfeld
 Amy Arnsten, neuroscientist
 Juliette Atkinson (1873–1944), tennis player who won the US Open singles title three times, in addition to seven US Open titles in doubles and three in mixed doubles
 Kathleen Atkinson (1875–1957), tennis player who won two US Open doubles titles together with her sister Juliette
 Shan K. Bagby (born 1967), U.S. Army brigadier general and the 28th Chief of the Army Dental Corps
 Dan Barry, reporter for The New York Times
 Arthur C. Bartner (born 1940), musician best known as the director of Spirit of Troy, the marching band for the University of Southern California
 Ahmed Best (born 1973), voice actor who portrayed Jar Jar Binks in the Star Wars film series
 Mark Blum (1950–2020), Obie Award-winning theater actor who also appeared extensively in films and television, including a lead role in the 1985 film Desperately Seeking Susan
 Seth Boyden (1788–1870), inventor
 Zach Braff (born 1975), actor, Scrubs, Garden State
 Marques Brownlee (born 1993), YouTube personality under the name 'MKBHD'
 Norbert Leo Butz (born 1967), actor, and his wife Michelle Federer (born 1973), an actress
 Mya Byrne (born 1978), singer, songwriter and guitarist
 P. J. Byrne (born 1974), film and television actor who has appeared in Horrible Bosses, Final Destination 5 and Wolf of Wall Street, as well as being the voice of Bolin on Nickelodeon's animated TV series The Legend of Korra
 Archie Campbell (1903–1989), Major League Baseball player
 Patricia Charache (1929–2015), physician specializing in infectious disease and microbiology
 Alta Cohen (1908–2003), former professional baseball player who played outfield from 1931 to 1933 with the Brooklyn Robins/Dodgers and Cincinnati Reds
 Claude Coleman Jr. (born 1948), musician who is best known as the drummer for the alternative rock group Ween.
 Robert De Grasse (1900–1971), cinematographer
 Paula Dow (born 1955), served from 2010 to 2012 as the 58th Attorney General of New Jersey, appointed by incoming Governor Chris Christie
 Asher Brown Durand (1796–1886), painter
 Raymond M. Durkin (1936–2014), politician who served as chairman of the New Jersey Democratic State Committee
 Christine Ebersole (born 1953), actress and Tony Award winner, is a current resident
 Pablo Eisenberg (born 1932), scholar, social justice advocate and tennis player
 Mike Enoch (born 1977), White Nationalist blogger and podcaster, founder of The Right Stuff Radio
 Paul R. Ehrlich (born 1932), entomologist, professor of population studies and author of The Population Bomb
 Bruce Feirstein (born 1956), screenwriter and humorist best known for his contributions to the James Bond series and his best selling humor books, including Real Men Don't Eat Quiche
 Fred Feldman (born 1941), philosopher who specializes in ethical theory.
 Christian Fuscarino (born ), community organizer, LGBT activist and the Executive Director of Garden State Equality
 Justin Brice Guariglia (born 1974), visual artist and former National Geographic photographer
 Jules Heningburg (born 1996), professional lacrosse player on the Redwoods Lacrosse Club of the Premier Lacrosse League and New England Black Wolves of the National Lacrosse League
 Grace Foster Herben (1864–1938), educator and missionary
 R. Graham Huntington (1897–1957), politician who served three terms in the New Jersey General Assembly representing Essex County.
 David Javerbaum (born 1971), executive producer of The Daily Show with Jon Stewart
 Amos E. Joel Jr. (1918–2008), electrical engineer who invented a switching device that allowed for the creation of cell phones, among his more than 70 patents
 Benjamin Franklin Jones (1869–1935), Speaker of the New Jersey General Assembly in 1900
 Joe Kinney (born ), college baseball coach and former outfielder who is the head coach of the Lafayette Leopards baseball team
 Eileen Kraus (1938–2017), business executive who broke the glass ceiling to become the first woman to run a major bank in Connecticut
 Ken Kurson (born 1968), political consultant, writer and journalist, who was editor-in-chief of The New York Observer between 2013 and 2017
 George Ludlow Lee Sr. (1901–1966), chairman of the board of Red Devil, Inc.
 Leyla McCalla (born 1985), musician
 William G. McLoughlin (1922–1992), historian and prominent member of the history department at Brown University from 1954 to 1992
 Cedric McMillan (1977–2022), IFBB professional bodybuilder
 Anisa Mehdi, film director and journalist
 Richard Meier (born 1934), architect whose work includes his design of the Getty Center
 Bea Miller (born 1999), finalist on The X Factor
 Grace Mirabella (1929–2021), fashion journalist who was editor-in-chief of Vogue magazine between 1971 and 1988, after which she founded Mirabella magazine
 Candy Moore (born 1947), actress who began her career appearing on television series as Leave It to Beaver, The Lucy Show and Letter to Loretta
 Paul J. Moore (1868–1938), represented New Jersey's 8th congressional district from 1927 to 1929
 Clayton Morris (born 1976), Fox News Channel co-host
 Ibtihaj Muhammad (born 1985), sabre fencer and member of the United States fencing team, best known for being the first Muslim woman to wear a hijab to compete for the U.S. team at the 2016 Summer Olympics
 Yosh Nijman (born 1995), American football offensive tackle for the Green Bay Packers of the National Football League
 Kevin O'Connor (born 1968/1969), television personality who has been the host of the PBS home renovation series This Old House since 2003
 Ellen Pao (born 1970), lawyer and business executive, who was CEO of Reddit
 Kym Ragusa (born 1966), writer and documentary filmmaker
 James Ricalton (1844–1929), teacher, photographer and inventor
 Eugene G. Rochow (1909–2002), inorganic chemist who worked on organosilicon chemistry
 Theodore Roosevelt (1858–1919), spent several summers in Maplewood visiting his uncle Cornelius V.S. Roosevelt's home and property, known as The Hickories, covering , an area now partly covered by Roosevelt Road and Kermit Road
 Rotimi (born 1988), actor and singer
 Herb Scherer (1929–2012), professional basketball player who played for the Tri-Cities Blackhawks and New York Knicks
 Norman Schwarzkopf Sr. (1895–1958), first superintendent of the New Jersey State Police and father of U.S. Army general Norman Schwarzkopf Jr.
 Robert Sheckley (1928–2005), science fiction writer
 Tim Squyres (born 1959), film editor of Crouching Tiger, Hidden Dragon, Hulk, Life of Pi and Syriana, among others
 SZA (born 1990), Neo Soul / R&B artist
 Agnes Sligh Turnbull (1888–1982), novelist and short story author
 Judith Viorst (born 1931), author and journalist
 George M. Wallhauser (1900–1993), represented  from 1959 to 1965
 George W. Webber (1920–2010), president of the New York Theological Seminary
 Kiely Williams (born 1986), singer / actress from The Cheetah Girls
 Richard Wolin (born 1952), historian
 Teresa Wright (1918–2005), actress

References

Sources

 League of Women Voters: Maplewood – More than a Train Stop, published privately
 Bates, Helen B. (ed): Maplewood Past and Present – A Miscellany, Maplewood: 1948, Princeton University Press

External links

 Township of Maplewood official website
 Maplewood Sex Offender Map
 Maplewood Sex Offender Map
 South Orange-Maplewood School District

 South Orange-Maplewood Place NJ

 
1861 establishments in New Jersey
Populated places established in 1861
Township form of New Jersey government
Townships in Essex County, New Jersey